Iowan Old Style is a digital serif typeface designed by John Downer and released by Bitstream in 1991.

Iowan Old Style is inspired by serif typefaces from Renaissance Italy, now called the “old-style” or Venetian model of typeface design, with influence from Downer’s work as hand-painter of signs. 

Compared to the historical models it is based on, Iowan has a higher x-height, meaning that the lower-case letters are taller and appear larger and wider, producing a design that is suitable for display and on-screen use. It is used as a default font on the Apple Books application and is included as a system font on iOS and macOS.

Design
Downer has described the design "more Venetian than Aldine" and influenced by lettering. It has diamond-dots (tittles) on the “i” and “j” similar to the Arts and Crafts-influenced Goudy Old Style. 

Iowan began as a design for ITC, but after the company dropped plans to release it, the font was bought up by Matthew Carter of Bitstream, who digitized and released it. Bitstream later revisited the design, adding ornaments and titling capitals. The character set includes small capitals and ligatures, as well as Cyrillic characters. Stephen Coles, an expert on digital fonts, describes its design as “hardworking.”

Gallery

References

External links
 Commercial release (MyFonts)
 Fonts in Use
 Font designer John Downer - Klingspor Museum article on John Downer's work
 John Downer Speedballs (Typographica)
 Sostav (Russian) - page on Downer's lettering and influences
 Type design in Iowa - Luc Devroye's page on Downer and other Iowa-based type designers

Digital typefaces
Typefaces with text figures
Old style serif typefaces
Typefaces designed by John Downer